Romana Hudecová (born September 21, 1993) is a female professional volleyball player from Slovakia, who has been a member of the country's U18 and senior national teams.

Sporting achievements

National championships
 2014/2015  Slovakian League, with Slávia Bratislava
 2015/2016  Slovakian League, with Slávia Bratislava
 2017/2018  Slovakian League, with Strabag Bratislava

National cups
 2014/2015  Slovakian Cup, with Slávia Bratislava
 2015/2016  Slovakian Cup, with Slávia Bratislava

Individuals
 2018 Slovakian Cup: Best Spiker

References

External links
 profile at CEV website, cev.lu

1993 births
Living people
Panathinaikos Women's Volleyball players